Heathcliff: The Movie is a 1986 animated anthology children's comedy film from DiC Audiovisuel, released by Atlantic Releasing under their Clubhouse Pictures label.

Plot
On a rainy day, Heathcliff (Mel Blanc) recalls his past exploits to his three nephews (and a mouse), through a compilation of episodes originally broadcast on the TV series.

Stories
 "Cat Food for Thought" - Heathcliff becomes a TV star after getting rid of his competition.
 "Heathcliff's Double" - There's a new cat in town called Henry who looks exactly like Heathcliff, and everybody mistakes him for Heathcliff.
 "The Siamese Twins" - There are two new cats in town that are ruining Heathcliff's reputation, making everyone think Heathcliff is the cause of their troubles.
 "An Officer and an Alley Cat" - In a loose parody of An Officer and a Gentleman, Heathcliff goes to obedience school in order to qualify for a contest where the first prize is a lifetime supply of cat food.
 "The Catfather" - In this parody of The Godfather, Heathcliff collects gifts for the Catfather, oblivious to the fact that the Catfather is the scare of the town.
 "Boom Boom Pussini" - Hector gets Heathcliff into a challenge to wrestle the famous cat wrestler Boom Boom Pussini who cheats to win matches.
 "Pop on Parole" - Heathcliff's conman father has gotten parole for jail time, but Heathcliff believes he broke out and the cops are chasing him.

After Heathcliff is finally finished telling his stories, his nephews angrily throw him out of the house. The movie ends with Heathcliff saying "Those are my boys!" and laughing.

Voice cast

 Mel Blanc as Heathcliff
 Donna Christie as Iggy (5 segments)
 Jeannie Elias as Marcy (segment "An Officer and an Alley Cat")
 Peter Cullen as Pop (segment "Pop on Parole")
 Stanley Jones as Wordsworth (3 segments)
 Marilyn Lightstone as Sonja (4 segments), Mrs. Nutmeg (segment "Pop on Parole")
 Danny Mann as Hector (5 segments), Mr. Schultz (segment "The Siamese Twins")
 Derek McGrath as Lefty (segment "Pop on Parole"), Knuckles (segment "Pop on Parole"), Muggsy (segment "Heathcliff's Double"), Spike (5 segments), Mr. Woodley (segment "An Officer and an Alley Cat")
 Marilyn Schreffler as Mr. Woodley's Secretary (segment "An Officer and an Alley Cat")
 Danny Wells as General (segment "An Officer and an Alley Cat") and Announcer (segment "Cat Food for Thought")
 Ted Zeigler as Mr. Nutmeg (3 segments), Mungo (3 segments)

Uncredited
 Unknown voice actors as Heathcliff's Nephew, Mouse, Spike

Release
The film was released theatrically on January 17, 1986, by Clubhouse Pictures. It was released on VHS in the 1980s and 1990s by Paramount Home Video, KVC Home Video, and GoodTimes Home Video. It was released on VHS in 1997 by Sterling Entertainment Group.

Box office
Heathcliff: The Movie grossed $508,305 on its opening weekend and grossed $2,610,686 domestically by the end of its run. It is the 8th highest grossing G-rated film of 1986.

Reception
Caryn James of The New York Times stated that the film is "harmless", but thought that the children will be bored with this film. James also criticized the animation, the lip sync on the human characters, and the character of Heathcliff.

See also
 List of animated feature-length films
 List of package films

References

External links
 
 
 
 

Heathcliff (comics)
1986 films
1986 animated films
1980s American animated films
1980s children's comedy films
American anthology films
American children's animated comedy films
Canadian animated feature films
Canadian anthology films
Canadian comedy films
French animated films
Animated films about cats
Animated films based on animated series
Animated films based on comics
Films based on American comics
Films based on comic strips
Films edited from television programs
DIC Entertainment films
Atlantic Entertainment Group films
1986 comedy films
Films produced by Jean Chalopin
Films scored by Shuki Levy
Films scored by Haim Saban
1980s English-language films
Animated anthology films
1980s Canadian films
1980s French films